Clem Castro (born 10 December 1976), also known by the mononym as Clementine, is a Filipino singer-songwriter and music producer who gained recognition with the band Orange and Lemons. After the band's break up in 2007, Clementine formed The Camerawalls and founded Lilystars Records, his own independent record label. He is also known for his solo project Dragonfly Collector, in which he released his solo debut album.

Early life & musical influences
Clementine was raised surrounded by 60s rock n’ roll and psychedelic music and from an early age fell in love with the likes of The Beatles and later on post punk guitar groups like The Smiths, artists that he is still inspired by today. Clementine picked up his dad's guitar at the age of 10 and after several years of obsessive strumming and excessive effort to emulate his influences he discovered the art of song writing and composition and started by ear, through his personal life experiences, writing songs that will provide the foundation of undeniably one of the most successful bands in the country – Orange & Lemons.

Orange & Lemons
He formed Orange & Lemons in 1999 and with a collection of juvenile materials paved the way for independent recognition to mainstream success of the band. His role as chief songwriter, lead guitarist and the main creative force behind Orange & Lemons, he has produced solid albums that has reached the ears and fancy of foreign music enthusiasts in Japan, Germany, UK and US to name a few. Songs that without doubt has a touch of international appeal and sold gold and platinum records in the Philippines plus numerous awards and commercial projects.

Each album showcases his evolution as a guitarist and songwriter and his most groundbreaking and brooding work – Moonlane Gardens (2007) – ironically resulted in a fray between bandmates, management and label. A battle between creativity and commercialism ensues and after a few months concluded in the parting of ways. Moonlane Gardens was hailed 2007 Album of The Year during the NU Rock Awards.

The Camerawalls and Lilystars Records
The outfit that is Orange & Lemons officially disbanded in September 2007 after a successful US Tour. Clementine went back to indie status and formed a 3 piece indie pop band The Camerawalls and released the debut album "Pocket Guide To The Otherworld" on July, 2008 under his own indie label -- Lilystars Records earning a nomination  and recognition as one of the best new local group to come out with a solid release during the year. The debut album "Pocket Guide To The Otherworld" has become a landmark release that showed people what happens when contemporary indie pop meets good old Filipino sensibilities.

Clementine signed a number of obscure artists under his label and was the first to release physical CD singles. He also formed an events production called The POP Shoppe! to support notable indie acts and was able to produce his first major concert for the Swedish group Club 8 in Manila just recently.

Discography

Albums

With Orange & Lemons
'Love in the Land of Rubber Shoes & Dirty Ice Cream - (December 2003 - Terno Recordings)Strike Whilst the Iron Is Hot - (May 2005 - Universal Records)Moonlane Gardens - (June 2007 - Universal Records)Land in the Land of Rubber Shoes & Dirty Ice Cream (15th Anniversary Edition) - (June 2018 - Lilystar Records)

As Dragonfly CollectorThe World Is Your Oyster - (January 2015 - Lilystars Records)

With The CamerawallsPocket Guide to the Otherworld - [(July 2008 - Lilystars Records)

SinglesThere Is No Remaining in Place - (December 2013 - Lilystars Records)Wanderlust - (August 2012 - Lilystars Records)The Sight of Love - (February 2010 - Lilystars Records)Boys in the Backrooms - (2017 - Lilystar Records)

EPsBread and Circuses'' - (December 2010 - Lilystars Records)

References

External links
 Lilystars Records
 Musings Of A Commoner
 The Camerawalls

1976 births
Living people
21st-century Filipino musicians
Musicians from Bulacan
Filipino singer-songwriters